Leôncio Basbaum (born 6 November 1907- died 7 March 1969) was a Brazilian Marxist historian, medic and writer.

Child of Jewish immigrants from Ukraine, Basbaum was born and raised in the state of Pernambuco. He qualified as a medical doctor in Rio de Janeiro in 1929 and became involved in the Brazilian Communist Party following his graduation, dedicating the rest of his life to the Marxist philosophy.

References 

1907 births
1969 deaths
Brazilian communists
20th-century Brazilian historians
Brazilian people of Ukrainian-Jewish descent
Jewish historians
Jewish socialists
Marxist historians